Implenia is a Swiss real estate and construction services company with activities in development and civil engineering in Switzerland and Germany. Implenia is also active in tunnelling and related infrastructure construction in Austria, France, Sweden, Norway and Italy. The Group was formed at the beginning of 2006 from the merger of Basel-based Batigroup Holding AG with Geneva-based Zschokke Holding SA. The headquarters are located in Glattpark (Opfikon) in the canton of Zurich. Implenia is one of the 500 largest companies in Switzerland.

History

Origin 
Implenia was created out of a series of mergers between Swiss regional construction companies, but ultimately from the 2006 merger of Batigroup and Zschokke Holding. 

In mid-1997 Preiswerk Holding AG merged with Schweizerische Strassenbau- und Tiefbau-Unternehmung AG (Stuag) / Stuag Holding AG and Schmalz AG Bauunternehmung / Schmalz Holding AG to form Batigroup Holding based in Basel. Batigroup's core competencies centred on traditional construction activities, including road construction, poured asphalt, civil engineering, tunnel construction and building construction.

The basis of Zschokke Holding was the construction company Castor, Hersent et Zschokke, founded in 1872 in Aarau by Conrad Zschokke (1842-1918), which was transferred to the public limited company Conrad Zschokke in 1909. Through acquisitions and mergers, in 1982 the joint-stock company Heinr. Hatt-Haller and in 1997 Locher & Cie AG, among others, became part of Zschokke Holding, whose headquarters were most recently in Geneva. In addition to building construction, Zschokke acquired in particular general planning, general contracting and real estate management.

Due to the largely complementary business areas, Zschokke and Batigroup began talks about a possible merger in summer 2005. Following these discussions, the intention to merge to form Implenia was announced publicly on 15 November 2005. Finally, the shareholders of Zschokke and Batigroup approved the merger at simultaneous AGMs held on 2 March 2006. ZB Didumos AG, founded as a placeholder company for the future company, was renamed Implenia AG in the course of the merger in 2005. The headquarters of the new company became Zurich.

Implenia AG 
The shares of Zschokke and Batigroup were delisted from the SIX Swiss Exchange after close of trading on 3 March 2006. The merger was completed by exchanging shares for the new Implenia shares, the value ratio being set at 65 (Zschokke) to 35 (Batigroup). The first trading day of Implenia shares on the Swiss stock exchange was 6 March 2006. 

In 2010, Implenia had acquired the Norwegian Betonmast Anlegg, an Norwegian infrastructure specialist. Since March 2015, the German Bilfinger Construction (now renamed Implenia Construction) with activities in Germany, Austria and Sweden has also been part of the Group. The acquisition of Bilfinger Hochbau followed in 2016.

On 27 October 2020, Implenia announced an accelerated restructuring starting in 2021, marking a break with the construction group's years-long push for internationalization, which it declared over. Its stock market value halved over the past two years, largely due to previous project acquisitions and purchases (such as in Sweden between 2015 and 2017). The company withdrew from unprofitable business areas in some markets (Sweden, Norway and Romania) and has since focused largely on Switzerland and Germany. Here, Implenia is active as a real estate developer and manager, as well as in building construction, civil engineering and specialist businesses such as timber construction and facade technology. In the rest of Europe, the focus is largely on tunnel construction, as in Austria, France, Sweden, Norway and Italy. As part of this accelerated restructuring, Implenia annnced plans to lay off around 750 people and cut 2000 fulltime positions by 2023. This transformation was completed ahead of schedule.

In May 2021, Implenia completed the acquisition of BAM Swiss AG, a healthcare construction services provider in Switzerland headquartered in Basel. With this acquisition, Implenia took over BAM Swiss AG's current projects such as the planning and realization of the Aarau Cantonal Hospital, the BSSE in Basel - a modern laboratory and research building for biosystems science and engineering - as well as the Felix Platter Hospital project in Basel and an ETH student residence in Zurich.

Corporate structure 
Implenia's Chief Executive Officer (CEO) is André Wyss. Also on the Executive Board are Stefan Baumgärtner (CFO), Adrian Wyss (Head Division Real Estate), Jens Vollmar (Head Division Buildings), Christian Späth (Head Division Civil Engineering), Anita Eckardt (Head Division Specialties), Claudia Bidwell (Chief Human Resources Officer) and German Grüninger (General Counsel). Hans-Ulrich Meister is Chairman of the Board of Directors. The company generated sales of CHF 3.6 billion in 2022 and employed 7,639 people. It is headquartered in Opfikon, Switzerland.

Implenia's business areas are divided into four divisions: Real Estate, Buildings, Civil Engineering and Specialties.

Major projects 

Major projects involving the company include:
Roxburgh Dam completed in 1953
Dinorwig Power Station completed in 1984
Sunniberg Bridge completed in 1998
Stade de Genève completed in 2003
Pont de la Poya completed in 2014
Swissmill Tower completed in 2016
Gotthard Base Tunnel (Sedrun Section) completed in 2016
Nant de Drance Hydropower Plant, Finhaut, completed in 2018
Koralm Tunnel, Austria, due to complete in 2026
Gotthard Road Tunnel, main lot north, second tube, Switzerland, due to complete in 2027
Semmering Base Tunnel, lots 1.1 and 2.1 Gloggnitz and Fröschnitzgraben tunnel sections, Austria, due to complete in 2030
Grand Paris Express, Lot T2C of Line 15 South in France, due to complete in 2030
Brenner Base Tunnel, Austria, due to complete in 1932
Mont-Cenis Base Tunnel between Lyon in France and Turin in Italy, due to be completed by 2032

Awards (selection) 

 2012: Real Estate Award in the category "Project Development" for the residential development "Schorenstadt"
 2014: "Tunnelling Contractor of the Year" for Nant de Drance pumped storage power plant, which was selected as "Major Project of the Year" by the International Tunnelling & Underground Space Association (ITA-AITES)
 2019: "Prize for the development of a Swiss company in France" awarded by the France-Switzerland Chamber of Commerce and Industry (CCIFS)
 2020: IR Magazine Awards – Europe 2020 / Best annual report (small cap) / Winner
 2021: "Highest Reputation" by Deutschlandtest
 2022: Award in "Germany's Digital Pioneers" in the "Technology Reputation" category from the F.A.Z. Institute
 2022: Award "Digital Champion" by Deutschlandtest
 2022: Award for "Most Innovative Companies" by Deutschlandtest

Controversies 
Construction defects at the Letzigrund Stadium in Zurich, which was built by Implenia and still being completed under great time pressure for the 2008 European Soccer Championships, led to ten years of legal proceedings against the company. The starting point was cracks and defective weld seams on the steel girders, which Implenia denied as "scaremongering." However, the city of Zurich feared that the roof posed a danger to spectators and secured the roof with additional supports on the stands at its own expense. The proceedings were resolved in 2021 with a court settlement in which both parties agreed to mutually waive all outstanding claims.

References

Sources

External links

 Official website

Construction and civil engineering companies of Switzerland
Construction and civil engineering companies  established in 2006
Swiss companies established in 2006
Companies listed on the SIX Swiss Exchange
Companies based in the canton of Zürich